The Black Sea field mouse (Apodemus ponticus)  is a species of rodent in the family Muridae.
It is found in Armenia, Azerbaijan, Georgia, possibly Iran, Iraq, Russian Federation, and Turkey.

References

Apodemus
Mammals of Western Asia
Mammals of Azerbaijan
Mammals of Russia
Mammals described in 1936
Taxonomy articles created by Polbot